Echinops bannaticus, known as the blue globe-thistle, is a species of flowering plant in the family Asteraceae, native to southeastern Europe.

The Latin specific epithet bannaticus refers to the Banat, a region in Central Europe (now split between Romania, Hungary, and Serbia) where the plant is found.

Gallery

See also
List of Balkan endemic plants

References

bannaticus
Flora of Europe
Plants described in 1827